Mitch Apau (born 27 April 1990) is a Dutch footballer who plays as a right back for Eerste Divisie club Telstar.

Club career
He played for Veendam and Waalwijk before moving abroad to join Belgian side Westerlo in summer 2014.

In March 2015 Chelsea was rumoured to be interested in the defender, but in summer 2016 he extended his contract with Westerlo by a year.

In June 2018, Apau joined Fortuna Liga club Slovan Bratislava on a three-year deal. He made his league debut for the club on 22 July 2018 in a 4-1 away victory over Zlaté Moravce. He was released by Slovan on 12 October 2020.

In December 2020, Apau's arrival in Patro Eisden was announced.

On 30 July 2021, he joined Emmen on a one-year deal.

Honours
Slovan Bratislava
Slovak First Football League (2): 2018–19, 2019–20
Slovnaft Cup (1): 2019–20

References

External links
 Voetbal International profile 
 

1990 births
Living people
Footballers from Amsterdam
Association football fullbacks
Dutch footballers
Dutch expatriate footballers
Dutch sportspeople of Ghanaian descent
SC Veendam players
RKC Waalwijk players
K.V.C. Westerlo players
NK Olimpija Ljubljana (2005) players
ŠK Slovan Bratislava players
K. Patro Eisden Maasmechelen players
NK Slaven Belupo players
FC Emmen players
SC Telstar players
Eredivisie players
Eerste Divisie players
Belgian Pro League players
Slovenian PrvaLiga players
Slovak Super Liga players
Croatian Football League players
Expatriate footballers in Belgium
Dutch expatriate sportspeople in Belgium
Expatriate footballers in Slovenia
Dutch expatriate sportspeople in Slovenia
Expatriate footballers in Slovakia
Dutch expatriate sportspeople in Slovakia
Expatriate footballers in Croatia
Dutch expatriate sportspeople in Croatia